United States v. Salerno, 481 U.S. 739 (1987), was a United States Supreme Court decision that determined that the Bail Reform Act of 1984 was constitutional, which permitted the federal courts to detain an arrestee prior to trial if the government could prove that the individual was potentially a danger to society. The Act was held to violate neither the United States Constitution's Due Process Clause of the Fifth Amendment nor its Excessive Bail Clause of the Eighth Amendment.

Background
The case was brought up when the American Mafia member Anthony Salerno was arrested and indicted for violating the Racketeer Influenced and Corrupt Organizations Act.

Decision
Chief Justice Rehnquist wrote the opinion for the majority. Justice Marshall and Justice Stevens each wrote dissenting opinions.

Salerno is famous for expounding the "no set of circumstances" test. Challengers who bring a facial challenge to a statute claim the statute is "void on its face" and so should be declared unconstitutional. That is an extremely high burden, as the challenger must show that no set of circumstances exists under which the statute would be valid.

The Court, however, recognized the well-established overbreadth doctrine, which provides a different standard for facial challenges of laws that are alleged to violate the First Amendment.

Aftermath
In October 1988, Salerno was convicted and sentenced to 70 years in prison, including a $376,000 fine, and ordered to forfeit half of the racketeering proceeds (estimated to be $30 million).

See also
 List of United States Supreme Court cases, volume 481
 List of United States Supreme Court cases
 Lists of United States Supreme Court cases by volume
 List of United States Supreme Court cases by the Rehnquist Court

References

Sources

External links
 

United States Supreme Court cases
United States Supreme Court cases of the Rehnquist Court
United States substantive due process case law
Excessive Bail Clause case law
1987 in United States case law